Erythronium caucasicum is a bulbous perennial plant in the lily family, native to the western and central Caucasus and the Alborz Mountains in North Iran.

The leaves are spotted. In contrast with its closest relative, Erythronium dens-canis, the anthers are yellow. The petals are usually white or yellowish.

References

caucasicum
Flora of the Caucasus
Flora of Iran
Plants described in 1933